The Medicine Hat A's were a Rookie League affiliate of the  Oakland Athletics, playing in the Pioneer League and located in the Canadian city of Medicine Hat, Alberta. They played for a single season, 1977, and their home field was Athletic Park.

History
The A's arrived in Medicine Hat in 1977, an expansion team for the Pioneer League along with the Calgary Cardinals. The A's had relocated from Boise, Idaho, where they had played two seasons as the Boise A's in the Northwest League. The A's finished in fifth place within the six-team Pioneer League; four members of the team would go on to appear in the major leagues. After the season, the team changed their affiliation to the Toronto Blue Jays and played 25 seasons as the Medicine Hat Blue Jays.

Season records

All-stars

See also
 Medicine Hat A's players

References

External links 
Baseball Reference – Medicine Hat teams

Sport in Medicine Hat
Baseball teams in Alberta
Defunct baseball teams in Canada
Defunct Pioneer League (baseball) teams
Oakland Athletics minor league affiliates
Baseball teams established in 1977